Barysevich is a Belarusian-language patronymic surname derived from the given name Barys. It corresponds to Russian Borisevich (Борисевич) and Polish Borysewicz.

Alexandrina Barysevich
Anzhelika Barysevich

Belarusian-language surnames
Patronymic surnames